Enicodes schreibersii is a species of beetle in the family Cerambycidae. It was described by Thomson in 1865. It is known from New Caledonia. It feeds on the breadfruit tree.

References

Enicodini
Beetles described in 1865